The 2017–18 Minnesota Golden Gophers men's basketball team represented the University of Minnesota in the 2017–18 NCAA Division I men's basketball season. The Gophers were led by fifth-year head coach Richard Pitino and played their home games at Williams Arena in Minneapolis, Minnesota as members of the Big Ten Conference. They finished the season 15–17, 4–14 in Big Ten play to finish in a three-way tie for 11th place. As the No. 11 seed in the Big Ten tournament, they lost in the first round to Rutgers.

Previous season
The Golden Gophers finished the 2016–17 season 24–10, 11–7 in Big Ten play to finish in fourth place. In the Big Ten tournament, they beat Michigan State in the quarterfinals before losing to Michigan in the semifinals. They received an at-large bid to the NCAA tournament as a No. 5 seed. The bid marked their first trip to the Tournament since 2013. In the First Round, they were upset by No. 12-seeded Middle Tennessee.

Head coach Richard Pitino was named Big Ten Coach of the Year. Reggie Lynch was named defensive player of the year. Nate Mason was named to the All-Big Ten First Team.

Offseason

Departures

Incoming transfers

Recruiting classes

2017 recruiting class

2018 recruiting class

Preseason 
In its annual preseason preview, the Blue Ribbon Yearbook ranked Minnesota No. 18 in the country.

Roster

Regular season

Alabama game - playing five on three
One of their most notable games of the season came on November 25, 2017 against No. 25 Alabama. During that game, Alabama's bench players left the bench to scuffle with Minnesota players midway through the second half. Because the players left the bench, every one of the players was ejected leaving Alabama with only five eligible players. Not long after the scuffle, Alabama's Dazon Ingram fouled out with 11:37 left in the game, which left Alabama with only four players. Shortly thereafter, Alabama's John Petty turned his ankle and was unable return for the rest of the game, leaving Alabama with only three players with 10:41 left in the match. While Minnesota was up by as many as 15 points under three-on-five competition, their lead diminished to as little as three points at one point due, in part, to Collin Sexton's 40-point game. However, the Golden Gophers would ultimately win 89–84 over the short-handed Crimson Tide. The game would be considered one of the strangest games in college basketball history.

Reggie Lynch suspension 
On January 5, 2018, Reggie Lynch was suspended from the University of Minnesota due to multiple sexual assault allegations that had occurred in 2016. The school's Equal Opportunity and Affirmative Action Office suspended Lynch from the University until 2020. Lynch appealed the finding and cannot play in any games, but was allowed to practice with the team.

Schedule and results
The 2018 Big Ten tournament will be held at Madison Square Garden in New York City. Due to the Big East's use of that venue for their conference tournament, the Big Ten tournament will take place one week earlier than usual, ending the week before Selection Sunday. The Gophers were initially slated to hold only one public exhibition game against Concordia-St. Paul, in addition to a closed scrimmage against Creighton. However, in response to the devastation from hurricanes Harvey, Irma, and Maria, the NCAA announced that it would allow Division I basketball teams to apply for a waiver to play a third exhibition game if the proceeds were donated to charity. The Gophers took advantage of the opportunity, scheduling an additional exhibition game against Wisconsin-Green Bay. The game was scheduled to be played at Maturi Pavilion, with all proceeds being donated to the American Red Cross hurricane relief efforts in Puerto Rico.

|-
! colspan=9 style=|Exhibition

|-
! colspan=9 style=|Regular season

|-
! colspan="9" style=|Big Ten tournament

Rankings

*AP does not release post-NCAA tournament rankings

Awards and honors

In-season awards

Jordan Murphy 
 Big Ten Player of the Week, November 13, 2017
 Big Ten Player of the Week, November 20, 2017
 Big Ten Player of the Week, November 27, 2017

Isaiah Washington 
 Big Ten Freshman of the Week, February 5, 2018

Postseason awards

Nate Mason 
 All-Big Ten Honorable Mention

Jordan Murphy 
 All-Big Ten Second Team (media)
 All-Big Ten Third Team (coaches)

References

2017-18 team
2017–18 Big Ten Conference men's basketball season
2018 in sports in Minnesota
2017 in sports in Minnesota